Yugoslav literature may refer to:

Bosnian literature
Croatian literature, medieval and modern culture of the Croats
Macedonian literature, begins with the Ohrid Literary School
Montenegrin literature, written in the South Slavic country of Montenegro, mainly in Serbian
Serbian literature, written in Serbian or in Serbia
Slovene literature, written in Slovene

See also
Yugoslav (disambiguation)
Association of Writers of Yugoslavia